Gomosto is a small village in Achaea, Greece. It is part of the community Kareika and the municipal unit Movri. It is situated 5 km southwest of Kato Achaia and 8 km northeast of Lappas.

See also
List of settlements in Achaea

References

Populated places in Achaea